The General Manuel Belgrano Bridge is a road bridge that joins the Argentine cities of Corrientes (capital of the Corrientes Province in the Mesopotamia) and Resistencia (capital of Chaco in the Chaco Region) over the course of the Paraná River (near the confluence with the Paraguay River). It was opened on May 10, 1973.

The bridge joins Corrientes' Provincial Route 12 with Chaco's Provincial Routes 11 and 16.

In 1999 the province of Corrientes was in the midst of a popular uprising, with protestors asking for the resignation of the provincial government. On 1999-12-17 the traffic over the bridge was blocked by demonstrators. The Gendarmerie intervened to suppress the protest, and killed two people. As of 2006 the investigations about the responsibility for these killings are still in progress.

References

  Monografias.com, Provincia de Corrientes.
  Corrientes Noticias, 10 February 2006. A seis años de la represión en el Puente General Manuel Belgrano.
 

Cable-stayed bridges in Argentina
Bridges completed in 1973
Buildings and structures in Corrientes Province
Buildings and structures in Chaco Province
Bridges over the Paraná River
Buildings and structures in Corrientes